A ping of death is a type of attack on a computer system that involves sending a malformed or otherwise malicious ping to a computer. 

A correctly formed ping packet is typically 56 bytes in size, or 64 bytes when the Internet Control Message Protocol (ICMP) header is considered, and 84 bytes including Internet Protocol (IP) version 4 header. However, any IPv4 packet (including pings) may be as large as 65,535 bytes. Some computer systems were never designed to properly handle a ping packet larger than the maximum packet size because it violates the Internet Protocol. Like other large but well-formed packets, a ping of death is fragmented into groups of 8 octets before transmission. However, when the target computer reassembles the malformed packet, a buffer overflow can occur, causing a system crash and potentially allowing the injection of malicious code.

In early implementations of TCP/IP, this bug is easy to exploit and can affect a wide variety of systems including Unix, Linux, Mac, Windows, and peripheral devices. As systems began filtering out pings of death through firewalls and other detection methods, a different kind of ping attack known as ping flooding later appeared, which floods the victim with so many ping requests that normal traffic fails to reach the system (a basic denial-of-service attack).

Detailed information
The maximum packet length of an IPv4 packet including the IP header is 65,535 (216 − 1) bytes, a limitation presented by the use of a 16-bit wide IP header field that describes the total packet length.

The underlying data link layer almost always poses limits to the maximum frame size (See MTU). In Ethernet, this is typically 1500 bytes. In such a case, a large IP packet is split across multiple IP packets (also known as IP fragments), so that each IP fragment will match the imposed limit. The receiver of the IP fragments will reassemble them into the complete IP packet and continue processing it as usual.

When fragmentation is performed, each IP fragment needs to carry information about which part of the original IP packet it contains. This information is kept in the Fragment Offset field, in the IP header. The field is 13 bits long, and contains the offset of the data in the current IP fragment, in the original IP packet. The offset is given in units of 8 bytes. This allows a maximum offset of 65,528 ((213-1)*8). Then when adding 20 bytes of IP header, the maximum will be 65,548 bytes, which exceeds the maximum frame size. This means that an IP fragment with the maximum offset should have data no larger than 7 bytes, or else it would exceed the limit of the maximum packet length. A malicious user can send an IP fragment with the maximum offset and with much more data than 8 bytes (as large as the physical layer allows it to be).

When the receiver assembles all IP fragments, it will end up with an IP packet which is larger than 65,535 bytes. This may possibly overflow memory buffers which the receiver allocated for the packet, and can cause various problems.

As is evident from the description above, the problem has nothing to do with ICMP, which is used only as payload, big enough to exploit the problem. It is a problem in the reassembly process of IP fragments, which may contain any type of protocol (TCP, UDP, IGMP, etc.).

The correction of the problem is to add checks in the reassembly process. The check for each incoming IP fragment makes sure that the sum of "Fragment Offset" and "Total length" fields in the IP header of each IP fragment is smaller or equal to 65,535. If the sum is greater, then the packet is invalid, and the IP fragment is ignored.
This check is performed by some firewalls, to protect hosts that do not have the bug fixed.
Another fix for the problem is using a memory buffer larger than 65,535 bytes for the re-assembly of the packet. (This is essentially a breaking of the specification, since it adds support for packets larger than those allowed.)

Ping of death in IPv6
In 2013, an IPv6 version of the ping of death vulnerability was discovered in Microsoft Windows. Windows TCP/IP stack did not handle memory allocation correctly when processing incoming malformed ICMPv6 packets, which could cause remote denial of service. This vulnerability was fixed in MS13-065 in August 2013. In 2020, another bug in ICMPv6 was found around Router Advertisement, which could even lead to remote code execution.

See also
 INVITE of Death
 LAND
 Ping flood
 ReDoS
 Smurf attack

References

External links
 
Ping of death at Insecure.Org

Denial-of-service attacks